The Conservative Christian Fellowship (CCF) is an organisation working within the British Conservative Party. Established in 1990 by Tim Montgomerie and David Burrowes, while they were students at Exeter University, the organisation supports Christians in the Conservative Party.

The CCF organises events and meetings for the party and its supporters across the UK. It is also an active participant in the cross-party group Christians in Politics, which include Christian MPs in the UK.

Organisation
The CCF's headquarters are at the Conservative Campaign Headquarters in Westminster, but it is funded solely by its supporters. Its previous executive directors include Gareth Wallace, Tim Montgomerie, Paul Woolley, Elizabeth Berridge and Colin Bloom. As of August 2016, its current chair is John Glen.

References

Organizations established in 1990
Christian political organizations
Anti-abortion organisations in the United Kingdom
Organisations associated with the Conservative Party (UK)
1990 establishments in the United Kingdom